George Gross may refer to:

 George Gross (journalist) (1923–2008), Canadian sport journalist
 George Gross (American football) (1941–2010), American football defensive tackle
 George Gross (water polo) (born 1952), Canadian Olympic water polo player

See also
 George Grosz (sometimes "Gross") (1893–1959), German artist known especially for his caricatural drawings and paintings of Berlin life in the 1920s.